Słupie may refer to the following places:
Słupie, Lublin Voivodeship (east Poland)
Słupie, Gmina Bakałarzewo in Podlaskie Voivodeship (north-east Poland)
Słupie, Gmina Suwałki in Podlaskie Voivodeship (north-east Poland)